Gramm was an Icelandic record label created by Ásmundur Jónsson and Einar Örn Benediktsson in 1981.

Located in Reykjavík, Gramm’s first release was a 10-track 7" vinyl titled Tilf by Purrkur Pillnikk, a punk group led by Einar Örn.

Besides releasing all Purrkur Pillnikk's records, Gramm also issued works of artists like the English experimental group Psychic TV, Björk's first band Tappi Tíkarrass and Kukl (featuring Björk and Einar Örn). Rock band Þeyr and punk groups such as Vonbrigði were also associated with Gramm.

In 1987, Gramm went bankrupt. Ásmundur and some of the musicians who were playing in Kukl created Smekkleysa, which ultimately became Bad Taste, known worldwide by the Sugarcubes.

See also
 List of record labels
 Gramm discography

References

External links
 Official site

Icelandic record labels
Record labels established in 1981
Record labels disestablished in 1987
Experimental music record labels